The Charles and Mary Ann (Molly) Goodnight Ranch House, near Goodnight, Texas, was built in 1888.  It was listed on the National Register of Historic Places in 2007.

It is located in Armstrong County, Texas at US 287 and 5000 Block County Road 25.

A predecessor building may have been incorporated as the kitchen within the complex house. Outbuildings include a carriage house, cold storage, and servants quarters buildings, and the remains of a water tower.

It was a home of Charles Goodnight (1836-1929).

It later housed the Charles Goodnight Historical Center, a museum.

See also

National Register of Historic Places listings in Armstrong County, Texas

References

External links

Museums in Armstrong County, Texas
National Register of Historic Places in Armstrong County, Texas
Victorian architecture in Texas
Queen Anne architecture in Texas
Houses completed in 1888
Historic house museums in Texas